Wildrose is a 1984 American independent drama film directed by John Hanson, produced by New Front Films, and distributed by Troma. It stars Lisa Eichhorn and Tom Bower supported by a cast of largely nonprofessional actors, and is predominantly set and filmed in Minnesota's Iron Range.

Plot 
Recently divorced from her abusive alcoholic husband (Stephen Yoakam), June's (Lisa Eichhorn) job as a miner in Minnesota's Mesabi Range becomes more challenging because of harassment from her male colleagues and a lack of support from her mother. She considers her independence, her family, and her future with fellow miner Rick (Tom Bower) as she develops a romantic relationship with him.

Cast

Production 
The film was shot on location in Minnesota's Mesabi Iron Range, including town scenes in Eveleth. Other scenes were filmed in Bayfield, Wisconsin.

It was made for under $1 million (equivalent to $ million in ).

Release and reception 
The film was selected for the Museum of Modern Art's New Films/New Directors series, and was a finalist for the Critics Prize at the Venice Film Festival. Tom Bower was nominated for the Independent Spirit Award for Best Male Lead. It screened out of competition at the Berlin Film Festival and at the Boston Film Festival.

Ms. magazine called it "[as] visually rich as it is emotionally resonant." The Los Angeles Times review wrote that the "small core of professional actors creates collides with the film's numerous self-conscious non-professionals, who inadvertently remind us that Eichhorn, Bower and others are, after all, 'acting' ... But the pluses outweigh the minuses." Variety called Eichhorn's performance "moving, natural ... in a decidedly unglamorous role" and praised the camerawork as "extraordinary, vivid."

See also 
 Ruby in Paradise
 North Country

References

External links 
 
 
 
 
 

American drama films
American independent films
1984 films
1984 drama films
1984 independent films
1980s American films
1980s English-language films
1980s feminist films
Films about mining
Films about the working class
Films shot in Minnesota
Films set in Minnesota